Peerapong Ruennin (born 14 September 1995) is a Thai professional footballer who plays as a goalkeeper for Thai League 1 club Nongbua Pitchaya.

References

External links

1995 births
Living people
Peerapong Ruennin
Peerapong Ruennin
Peerapong Ruennin
Association football goalkeepers
Peerapong Ruennin
Peerapong Ruennin
Peerapong Ruennin
Peerapong Ruennin
Peerapong Ruennin
Peerapong Ruennin
Peerapong Ruennin